Hastinganj is a town in Faizabad city in the Indian state of Uttar Pradesh and is Subpost Office of Hastinganj.

Demographics
 India census, Hastinganj had a population of 45000. Males constitute 51% of the population and females 49%. Rikabganj has an average literacy rate of 62%, higher than the national average of 59.5%: male literacy is 71%, and female literacy is 52%. In Hastinganj, 17% of the population is under 6 years of age.

References

Neighbourhoods in Faizabad
Industrial Area in Faizabad